Grega Žemlja defeated Martin Fischer 6–4, 7–5 in the final to win the first edition of the tournament.

Seeds

Draw

Finals

Top half

Bottom half

References
 Main Draw
 Qualifying Draw

Tilia Slovenia Open - Singles
2013 Singles